Commerce Trust Building is a 15-story tower built for Kansas City Missouri's biggest bank Commerce Bancshares in 1907  and was Kansas City's second skyscraper, following the New York Life building.

It has facade of red granite and white terra cotta tiles and was Missouri's tallest building when it opened.

Formerly on the site was the home of the Kansas City Journal which in turn was taken over by Commerce. Harry Truman worked in the predecessor building.

Its architect Jarvis Hunt also designed Union Station and the headquarters of the Kansas City Star. The construction company was the George A. Fuller Company which built the Flatiron Building in the New York City and as a company continues to build major skyscrapers around the world.

In 1965 Commerce built a larger adjoining building Commerce Tower but has continued to use the original building.

Part of the renovation also included illuminating the lobby's ornate glass ceiling to replicate natural sunlight.

External links
skycraperpage.com profile

Skyscraper office buildings in Kansas City, Missouri
Office buildings completed in 1907
Downtown Kansas City
1907 establishments in Missouri